Cees Paauwe (born 3 November 1977) is a Dutch former professional footballer who played as a goalkeeper.

Career
Born in Dronten, Netherlands, Paauwe played for Lyra, SV 't Harde and FC Zwolle as a youth. From 1995 to 2000 he played for FC Twente where he made his debut in the Eredivisie in his first year. In the first five seasons with Twente he only played during two matches. In summer 2000 he moved to Eerste Divisie club SC Cambuur where he became first choice. Two years later he returned to FC Twente where he replaced Sander Boschker when the latter was transferred to Ajax Amsterdam. Until then, and also later, Paauwe never saw more than five appearances per Eredivisie season. After Boschker's return in the winter of the 2003–04 season, Paauwe became second choice again.

In 2005, he moved to ADO Den Haag but did not play much due to a knee injury he suffered later that year. His contract with ADO was not extended in 2006 and he returned to FC Twente. In the summer of 2010, he was transferred to SBV Excelsior.

In July 2011, he left the Eredivisie for Quick '20 in the Topklasse, the third tier of football in the Netherlands. But on 30 August 2011, around a month later, he returned to the Eredivisie, joining N.E.C. Nijmegen.

Cees Paauwe is the younger brother of former Feyenoord player Patrick Paauwe.

Honors
Twente
 UEFA Intertoto Cup: 2006
 Dutch Champion: 2010

References

External links
 Statistics at VI.nl 
 

1977 births
Living people
Footballers from Dronten
Dutch footballers
Netherlands under-21 international footballers
Association football goalkeepers
Eredivisie players
Eerste Divisie players
Excelsior Rotterdam players
SC Cambuur players
FC Twente players
PEC Zwolle players
ADO Den Haag players
Quick '20 players
NEC Nijmegen players